Misterton railway station was a railway station in Misterton, Nottinghamshire, England which is now closed.

It was opened by the Great Northern and Great Eastern Joint Railway and closed by British Railways in 1961. Trains between Gainsborough and Doncaster continue to pass through.

References

Disused railway stations in Nottinghamshire
Former Great Northern and Great Eastern Joint Railway stations
Railway stations in Great Britain opened in 1867
Railway stations in Great Britain closed in 1961